Shinmachi Station (新町駅) is the name of two train stations in Japan:

Shinmachi Station (Gunma) in Takasaki, Gunma Prefecture
 Shinmachi Station (Kumamoto) in Chuo-ku, Kumamoto, Kumamoto Prefecture